Route 32 is a list of highways numbered 32.

Route 32 may also refer to:

Route 32 (WMATA), a bus route in Washington, D.C.
London Buses route 32

32